This is a list of winners and nominees of the Primetime Emmy Award for Outstanding Hairstyling for a Single-Camera Series. The category was previously awarded as Outstanding Hairstyling for a Series. In 2008, it splits to honor single-camera series and Outstanding Hairstyling for a Multi-Camera Series or Special.

In the following list, the first titles listed in gold are the winners; those not in gold are nominees, which are listed in alphabetical order. The years given are those in which the ceremonies took place:



Winners and nominations

1970s
Outstanding Individual Achievement in Any Area of Creative Technical Crafts

Outstanding Achievement in Hairstyling

1980s

Outstanding Hairstyling for a Series

1990s

2000s

Outstanding Hairstyling for a Single-Camera Series

2010s

Programs with multiple awards

4 awards
 Downton Abbey
 Mad Men

3 awards
 Dr. Quinn, Medicine Woman

2 awards
 Rome
 Tracey Takes On... 
 Westworld

Programs with multiple nominations

9 nominations
 Mad Men

8 nominations
 Game of Thrones

7 nominations
 Star Trek: Deep Space Nine

6 nominations
 Star Trek: The Next Generation
 Star Trek: Voyager

5 nominations
 Alias
 Boardwalk Empire
 Downton Abbey
 Dr. Quinn, Medicine Woman

4 nominations
 Desperate Housewives
 Little House on the Prairie

3 nominations
 Buffy the Vampire Slayer
 Deadwood
 Dynasty
 Glee
 Sex and the City
 Six Feet Under
 Tracey Ullman's State of the Union

2 nominations
 American Dreams
 The Borgias
 Carnivàle
 Crime Story
 The Crown
 GLOW
 Homefront
 The Knick
 The Marvelous Mrs. Maisel
 Moonlighting
 Penny Dreadful
 Pushing Daisies
 Rome
 Star Trek: Enterprise
 Thirtysomething
 The Tudors
 Ugly Betty
 Westworld

References

Hairstyling for a Single-Camera Series
Awards disestablished in 2019
Awards established in 1970
Hairdressing